Sohang Chatterjee is an Indian-born scientist/entrepreneur who has co-founded two biotech companies and expanded the recent company's operations in the USA.

Education
Chatterjee holds a B.Sc. degree in Microbiology, Chemistry and Botany from St. Joseph's College, Bangalore, India (1992). He completed his Masters in Molecular biology from Tata Institute of Fundamental Research, Bangalore, (1995).  He then undertook research at Cornell University, New York, USA, and SUNY Buffalo (1995-2000).

Career
Chatterjee has experience in various scientific fields. In 2000, he was the Group Leader at Millipore India (P) Ltd., Bangalore until June 2006. From July 2006 till May 2007, he was the Division Head at Avestha Gengraine Technologies (P) Ltd., Bangalore.

In June 2007, Chatterjee co-founded Inbiopro Solutions Private Limited, Bangalore, India and subsequently became its CEO and Director till November 2012 when Inbiopro was sold. In July 2013, Chatterjee co-founded Theramyt Biologics Private Limited, Bangalore and became its Director and CEO.

In June 2015, Chatterjee co-founded Zumutor Biologics Inc.; ( an associate of Theramyt) He has presented several scientific papers and also has a number of patents filed in the areas of monoclonal antibody discovery and modification to enhance their potency.

Chatterjee is a member of ABLE (Association of Biotechnology Led Enterprises) in India and continues to be a jury member and mentor for the various start-up programs supported by ABLE in India since 2013. As a charter member of TiE in Boston, he is actively involved in contributing to biotechnology entrepreneurship and organizational development of young start-ups.

References

Living people
Indian chief executives
Scientists from Bangalore
Year of birth missing (living people)